Üçtəpə (also, Uchepe) is a village in Baku, Azerbaijan.

References 

Populated places in Baku